Kunhome' is a small village situated in Thondernadu Panchayath, Wayanad district,  Kerala, India. It has a diverse cultural heritage. Kunhome is a hub for domestic and international tourists. The village has a distinct identity in tourist destinations of Wayanad due to its historical and cultural heritage., 
           കുഞ്ഞോം.                                              ഷാക്കിർ മൊട്ടേമൽ

                കാടും മേടും മഞ്ഞും  മലകളും  അരുവികളും  ഇഴചേര്‍ന്ന് കിടക്കുന്ന   സുന്ദര ഗ്രാമം,   വശ്യസുന്ദരമായ  പ്രകൃതിഭംഗിയാൽ മോഹിപ്പിക്കുന്ന ചെറുഗ്രമാം.  

       നൂല്‍മഴയും കോടമഞ്ഞും പെയ്തിറങ്ങുന്ന ഈ ഹരിതഭൂമിയില്‍                               എവിടെത്തിരിഞ്ഞാലുമുണ്ട് സുന്ദര കാഴ്ചകളിലേക്കുള്ള കിളിവാതിലുകൾ .   വിനോദ സഞ്ചാരികളേയും  പ്രകൃതി സ്നേഹികളേയും ഒരു  പോലെ  ആകര്‍ഷിക്കുന്ന ഇടമായി  കുഞ്ഞോം ചുരുങ്ങിയ കാലംകൊണ്ട് മാറിയിരിക്കുന്നു. 

                            പശ്ചിമഘട്ടത്തില്‍ സ്ഥിതി ചെയ്യുന്ന  ഭൂപ്രകൃതി തന്നെയാണ് സഞ്ചാരികളെ ഇവിടേയ്ക്ക് ആകര്‍ഷിപ്പിക്കുന്ന പ്രധാന ഘടകം.   ഇടതൂർന്ന  കാടുകളും തേയില തോട്ടങ്ങളും, ഇവിടം സഞ്ചാരികള്‍ക്ക് പ്രിയങ്കരമാക്കുന്നു. ടൂറിസത്തിന്റെ പുതിയ കാല വാഗ്ദാനം കൂടിയാണ് കുഞ്ഞോം എന്നുപറഞ്ഞാല്‍ അതിശയോക്തിയാകില്ല. കാരണം കുഞ്ഞോം പൈതൃക മ്യൂസിവും, കുങ്കിച്ചിറയും, ഒരപ്പ് വെള്ളച്ചാട്ടവും  റിസോര്‍ട്ടുകളും, പാരമ്പര്യ ആദിവാസി ചികിത്സാ കേന്ദ്രങ്ങളും പ്രകൃതിജന്യ സുഗന്ധദ്രവ്യങ്ങളും ഇതിനെല്ലാം പുറമേ കുഞ്ഞോത്തെ അ ധിപുരാതനമായ മുസ്ലിം പള്ളിയും  മറ്റൊരു കൗതുക  കാഴ്ച്ചയാണ്. 

              എകദേഷം എണ്ണൂർ വർഷക്കാലം പഴയക്കം കണക്കാക്കപ്പെടുന്ന  പള്ളി ഇന്നും അത്ഭുതമാണ്.  മനോഹരമായ അതിന്റെ നിർമ്മിതിയും ആകർഷകമായ അതിലെ കൊത്തുപണികളും  ഏവരേയും അത്ഭു തപ്പെടുത്തുന്നു. AD 629 ൽ നിർമിച്ച ഇന്ത്യയിലെ ആദ്യ മുസ്ലിം പള്ളിയായ ചേരമാൻ ജുമാ മസ്ജിദിനോട് സാമ്യമുള്ള കൊത്തുപണിയും നിർമിതിയുമാണ് പള്ളിയുടേത് .

              കുഞ്ഞോത്തേക്ക് വിനോദസഞ്ചാരികളെ ആകർഷിക്കുന്ന  മറ്റൊരു പ്രധാന ഘടകമാണ് കുങ്കിച്ചിറ, ശാന്തമായ നിബിഡവനത്തിന്റെ നടുവിലായി മനോഹരമായ ചെറു തടാകം,  അതിന്റെ  നടുവിലായി കുങ്കിയെന്ന പഴയകാല ഭരണാതികാരിയുടെ പ്രതിമ. പഴശ്ശിരാജയുടെ  പടനായകൻമാരിൽപ്പെട്ട  ഇടച്ചേരി കുങ്കന്റെ സഹോദരിയാണ് കുങ്കി.  

             കുങ്കിച്ചിറയിൽ പഴശ്ശിരാജ പണികഴിപ്പിച്ചു എന്ന് കരുതപ്പെടുന്ന കോട്ടയുടെ അവശിഷ്ങ്ങൾ ഇന്നും കൊടും വനത്തിൽ ഉണ്ട്. വാളുകളും പാത്രങ്ങളും ഇവിടെ നിന്ന്  കണ്ടെടുത്തിരുന്നു.    

                         വൈകുന്നേരങ്ങളിൽ കോടമഞ്ഞിനാൽ മൂടപ്പെടുന്ന മനോഹരമായ കാഴ്ചയും ശാന്തമായ അന്തരീക്ഷവും ഒരുക്കുന്ന  അനുഭവമാണ്  കുങ്കിച്ചിറ സമ്മാനിക്കുന്നത്. ഇതിനോട് ഓരം ചേർന്ന് ഉള്ള  പൈതൃക മ്യൂസിയത്തിന്റെ പണിയും പുരോഗമിക്കുകയാണ്.                            

                കുങ്കിച്ചിറക്ക് അടുത്തായി നിബിഡ വനത്തിന്റെ നടുവിലായി ചപ്പേൽ  പുൽമൈതാനം  മറ്റൊരു മനോഹര കാഴ്ച്ചയാണ് നാല് ഭാഗവും കൊടുംവനത്താൽ മൂടപ്പെടുകയും കണ്ണെത്താ  ദൂരെത്തേക്ക്  പടർന്ന് കിടക്കുന്ന മൈതാനം  പഴശ്ശിരാജയുടെ പടയാളികളും  കുതിരപ്പടയും  അഭ്യാസം നടത്തിയിരുന്ന സ്ഥലമാണെന്ന് കരുതപ്പെടുന്നു. 

              ട്രക്കിങ്ങിനു ഏറ്റവും അനുയോജ്യവുമാണ് ഈ ഭൂമി. മയ്യഴി പുഴയുടെ ഉത്ഭവ സ്ഥലമായ  കുങ്കിച്ചിറയിൽ നിന്നും കൊടും കാടിലൂടെ പാറ കെട്ടുകളും അരുവികളും താണ്ടി 6 കിലോമീറ്റർ പോയാൽ കോഴിക്കോട് ജില്ലയിലെ വിലങ്ങാട് എത്തിച്ചേരാം. ചുരമില്ലാതെ വയനാട് കോഴിക്കോട് ജില്ലകളെ   എളുപ്പം ബന്ധിപ്പിക്കുന്ന  പാതയും  ഇതിലെയാണ് എന്നത് മറ്റൊരു പ്രത്യേകതയാണ് .  

                  പാരമ്പര്യത്തിന്റെയും സംസ്‌കാരത്തിന്റെയും കാഴ്ചകള്‍ക്കൊപ്പം പുതിയ സമവാക്യങ്ങളും ചേരുന്ന കുഞ്ഞോതേക്കുള്ള യാത്ര ജീവിതത്തി മനോഹരമായ ഓര്‍മകള്‍ നല്‍കുന്ന ഒന്നായിരിക്കും എന്ന കാര്യത്തില്‍ സംശയമില്ല. 

  

മഞ്ഞുപുതച്ച  തേയില കുന്നുകൾക്കിടയിൽ  വയലുകളും ചെറുകുന്നുകളും,   ഇതിനിടയില്‍ തനിമ മാറാത്ത ആദിവാസികളുടെ ചെറുകുടിലുകൾ . കുളിരു പകരുന്ന ഈ ഭൂമിയിലേക്കു ദിനവും സഞ്ചാരികളുടെ പ്രവാഹമാണ്. 

             ഭൂപ്രകൃതിയും സുഖകരമായ കാലാവസ്ഥയും കൊണ്ട്‌ അനുഗ്രഹീതഭൂമിയാണ്‌ കുഞ്ഞോം നിരവധിപ്പേരാണ്‌ കുഞ്ഞോത്തിന്റെ പ്രകൃതിഭംഗി ആസ്വദിക്കാന്‍ ദിവസവും എത്തിച്ചേരുന്നത്‌. തിരക്കുകളുടെ ലോകത്തുനിന്നും ഒരു ഇടവേള ആഗ്രഹിക്കുന്നവര്‍ക്ക്‌ ചുറ്റിക്കറങ്ങി ആസ്വദിക്കാനുള്ളതെല്ലാം  കുഞ്ഞോo നിങ്ങൾക്കായി കരുതിയിട്ടുണ്ട്  .

Transportation
Kunhome can be accessed from Mananthavady or Kalpetta. The Periya ghat road connects Mananthavady to Kannur and Thalassery.  The Thamarassery mountain road connects Calicut with Kalpetta. The Kuttiady mountain road connects Vatakara with Kalpetta and Mananthavady. The Palchuram mountain road connects Kannur and Iritty with Mananthavady.  The road from Nilambur to Ooty is also connected to Wayanad through the village of Meppadi.

The nearest railway station is at Mysore and the nearest airports are Kozhikode International Airport-120 km, Bengaluru International Airport-290 km, and   Kannur International Airport, 58 km.

References
Kunhome wraps a lore and unending charm.

പഴശിയുടെ കോട്ട തേടി, വയനാടന്‍ വനത്തിനുള്ളില്‍.....

Work on Kumkichira heritage museum begins

Villages in Wayanad district
Mananthavady Area